Colibactin is a genotoxic metabolite produced by Escherichia coli and other Enterobacteriaceae ("enteric bacteria") believed to cause mutations leading to colorectal cancer and the progression of colorectal cancer. Colibactin is a polyketide peptide that can form interstrand crosslinks in DNA. Colibactin is only produced by bacterial strains containing a polyketide synthase genomic island (pks) or clb biosynthetic gene cluster.  About 20% of humans are colonized with E. coli that harbor the pks island.

Colibactin forms DNA inter-strand cross-links by alkylation of adenine moieties on opposing DNA strands. It induces lytic development in certain bacteria that contain prophages.

References

Bacterial toxins
Mutagens
Cyclopropanes
Spiro compounds
Thiazoles
Alkylating agents
Polyketides
Pyrrolines
Carboxamides